Fort Robert Smalls was a Civil War redoubt built by free blacks for the defense of Pittsburgh in 1863.

It was named in honor of Robert Smalls, a man who escaped from slavery in Beaufort, South Carolina with his crew and their families by capturing a Confederate transport ship and piloting it to the safety of a Union blockade around the harbor of Charleston, South Carolina in 1862.

History
According to historic preservationist Eliza Smith Brown, during the American Civil War, civic leaders in Pittsburgh ordered the construction of defensive structures, including forts and redoubts, in response to the threatened invasion of Pennsylvania by Confederate troops in 1863. Fort Robert Smalls was one of two of those installations which were known to have been built by black workers on McGuire's Hill.

It was named for Robert Smalls, a slave who commandeered a Confederate transport, the CSS Planter, and brought his family and others to freedom in the north. Its "four-to-five-foot-high earthen embankments" survived at the top of McGuire's Hill at the mouth of Becks Run in Arlington Heights until their 1930 destruction to make way for public housing.

References

Pittsburgh metropolitan area
Demolished buildings and structures in Pittsburgh
Pennsylvania in the American Civil War
1863 establishments in Pennsylvania
African Americans in the American Civil War
Demolished buildings and structures in Pennsylvania
Robert Smalls
Redoubts
Buildings and structures demolished in 1930